The 2010 Individual Junior Ice Racing European Championship was the second annual UEM Individual Junior Ice Racing European Championship, but first time for under 25 rider. The final was held in Kamensk-Uralsky, Russia on 30 and 31 January 2010, and was won by Sergey Karachintsev.

The Final 
January 30–31, 2010
 Kamensk-Uralsky, Sverdlovsk Oblast
“Metallurg” stadium (Length: 280 m)
Referee:  T. Bouin
Jury President:  S. Lyatosinsky
References 

Two Swedish place (#1 and #9) and two Finnish place (#8 and #12) was replaced by Russian rider. One Dutch place (#10) was replaced by German rider.
At the day two, Tikhonov (#11) was replaced by Akumbaev (#17), and Koltakov (#9) was replaced by Belousov (#18).

See also 
 2010 Individual Ice Racing World Championship
 2010 Individual Ice Racing European Championship
 Ice speedway

References 

Ice speedway competitions
European Individual Junior
Ice Racing